A mixtape is a compilation of songs recorded in a specific order.

Mixtape or The Mix Tape may also refer to:

Music

Albums
 Mix Tape, a 2006 album by Los Abandoned
 Mix Tape (The Felice Brothers album), 2010
 Mixtape (Hadouken! EP), 2007
 Mixtape (Stray Kids EP), 2018
 Mixtape, Vol. 1 (EP), a 2020 EP by Kane Brown
 The Mix Tape (KRS-One album), 2002
 The Mix Tape (MC Breed album), 2004
 The Mix Tape, Vol. 1, the 1995 installment of Funkmaster Flex's Mix Tape series
 The Mix Tape, Vol. II, the 1997 installment of Funkmaster Flex's Mix Tape series
 The Mix Tape, Vol. III, the 1999 installment of Funkmaster Flex's Mix Tape series
 The Mix Tape, Vol. IV, the 2000 installment of Funkmaster Flex's Mix Tape series
 The Mixtape (Meridian Dawn EP), 2014

Bands
 Mixtapes (band), American rock band

Songs
 "Mix Tape", a song from the play Avenue Q (2002)
 "Mix Tape", a song from Brand New's 2001 album Your Favorite Weapon (2001)
 "Mixtape" (Autumn Hill song), 2016
 "Mixtape", a song from Chance the Rapper's album Coloring Book (2016)
 "Mixtape", a song from Butch Walker's album, Letters (2004)

Other uses
 Mixtape (film), a 2021 American film
 Mixtape, a 2009 short film written and directed by Luke Snellin
 Mix Tape: The Art of Cassette Culture, a 2005 book edited by musician Thurston Moore
 Video mixtape, a stock footage movie consisting of video clips

See also